Nicephellus is a monotypic genus of Neotropical butterflies in the family Hesperiidae, in which it is placed in tribe Phocidini.

The sole species of the genus is Nicephellus nicephorus, also called the two-spotted scarlet-eye, and was originally described in 1876 by William Chapman Hewitson as Eudamus nicephorus. It is found from southern Mexico to Peru and western Brazil.

The wingspan is 28–30 mm. The wings are dark brown with red-brown overscaling basad on both wings, with faint pale discal macules on the posterior hindwings (at times extending to the forewings).

Original description

References

Eudaminae
Monotypic butterfly genera